The March 842 is an open-wheel formula racing car, design, developed and built by March Engineering, for Formula 2 racing, in 1984. It contested in the 1984 European Formula Two Championship, where its best result was a win at Hockenheim, being driven by Pascal Fabre, followed by a 2nd-place finish later in the season, at Donington Park, being driven by Emanuele Pirro. Its best result in the championship that year was a 5th-place finish, for German driver Christian Danner that year.

References

Formula Two cars
March vehicles